Furnace Creek 508 was an ultramarathon bicycle race that took place annually each October between 1989 and 2013 in Southern California. Its route started in Santa Clarita (25 miles north of Los Angeles), went northeast to Towne Pass and dropped into Death Valley, traversed Death Valley in the southern direction, crossed Mojave Desert and ended at Twentynine Palms. The race was named after the total length of its course (508 miles) and the location of its midpoint (near Furnace Creek).

Rather than use names or numbers as in other races and other sports, the Furnace Creek 508 identified riders and teams with "totems" - animal names said to signify or have a special meaning for a rider or team.

The race was discontinued in 2014 due to a policy change of the Death Valley National Park that prohibited competitive cycling events in the park. Its organizers have since created a new annual event, the "Silver State 508", which keeps the overall format and  the total distance of the course, but takes place in Nevada.

Until rules changes in 2003, the Furnace Creek 508 was a qualifying event for the Race Across America.

Route
Santa Clarita (start)
Antelope Valley
California City (82 miles)
Trona (152 miles)
Panamint Valley
Townes Pass
Furnace Creek (252 miles)
Death Valley
Salsberry Pass
Shoshone (325 miles)
Baker (382 miles)
Kelso (416 miles)
Amboy (450 miles)
Twentynine Palms (finish)

Participants and results
In 2006, Furnace Creek 508 had its largest number of entrants, at 179 (75 solo and 104 in teams). In order to be declared an "official finisher", an entrant must have crossed the finishing line within 48 hours (46 hours for relay teams). The official finishing rate was usually around 60% for solo cyclists and approaching 100% for relay teams. The median finishing time was around 36 hours.

Among solo competitors, overall records are 27:15:21 (men) and 28:46:34 (women).

External links
Official web site of Silver State 508

Cycle races in the United States
Cycling in California
Recurring sporting events established in 1989
1989 establishments in California
Road bicycle races